Finley Thomas Craske (born 27 January 2003) is an English footballer who plays as a defender for Truro City on loan from Plymouth Argyle.

Early life
Craske attended Ivybridge Community College in Ivybridge, Devon.

Career
He joined the academy of Plymouth Argyle at under-9 level. He signed a full-time apprenticeship at the club in summer 2019, and made his professional debut on 10 November 2020 as a second-half substitute in a 3–1 EFL Trophy victory over Newport County. He made his league debut for the club on 9 May 2021 as a substitute in a 1–0 defeat away to Gillingham on the final day of the season. Craske signed his first professional contract with the club in June 2022.

In September 2021, Craske joined Southern League Premier Division club Tiverton Town on a one-month loan deal. In November 2021, Craske joined Southern League Division One South club Plymouth Parkway on a one-month work experience loan deal. This move was later extended before Craske was recalled in February 2022. 

On 1 August 2022, Craske joined National League club Yeovil Town on a season-long loan deal. In January 2023, Craske joined Truro City on loan until the end of the season.

Career statistics

References

External links
 
 

2003 births
Living people
People from Wadebridge
English footballers
Association football midfielders
Plymouth Argyle F.C. players
Tiverton Town F.C. players
Plymouth Parkway F.C. players
Yeovil Town F.C. players
Truro City F.C. players
English Football League players
Southern Football League players
National League (English football) players